Ruzyně Prison is a prison in the Ruzyně neighborhood of Prague 6, Czech Republic.

History
Construction began in April 1949 to renovate a disused building near Prague–Ruzyně Airport and the prison opened by October, to house the Slánský trial victims. During the Communist era, arrested dissidents were held there, including Václav Havel, who later became President of Czechoslovakia. The prison is currently used to hold detainees awaiting trial.

References

External links

Prisons in the Czech Republic
Buildings and structures in Prague
Prague 6
1935 establishments in Czechoslovakia
20th-century architecture in the Czech Republic